The thumbnail crab, Thia scutellata, is a species of decapods, in the family of thiidae, whose carapace resembles a human thumbnail, a dense fringe of long hairs distinctly notched around the edge. Pale pink in colour with red to brown markings. It is found in the North Sea, north-east Atlantic and Mediterranean Sea. It is the only extant species in the genus Thia, although two fossil species are known. Their predators includes the atlantic cod.

References

Portunoidea
Crabs of the Atlantic Ocean
Crustaceans described in 1793

ceb:Thiidae